Mugla Passage (‘Protok Mugla’ \'pro-tok 'mu-gla\) is the 1.35 km wide passage between Half Moon Island and the north coast of Burgas Peninsula on Livingston Island in the South Shetland Islands, Antarctica.

The passage is named after the settlement of Mugla in southern Bulgaria.

Location
Bulgarian mapping in 2009.

Map
 L.L. Ivanov. Antarctica: Livingston Island and Greenwich, Robert, Snow and Smith Islands. Scale 1:120000 topographic map.  Troyan: Manfred Wörner Foundation, 2009.  
 Antarctic Digital Database (ADD). Scale 1:250000 topographic map of Antarctica. Scientific Committee on Antarctic Research (SCAR). Since 1993, regularly upgraded and updated.
 L.L. Ivanov. Antarctica: Livingston Island and Smith Island. Scale 1:100000 topographic map. Manfred Wörner Foundation, 2017.

References
 Bulgarian Antarctic Gazetteer. Antarctic Place-names Commission. (details in Bulgarian, basic data in English)
 Mugla Passage SCAR Composite Antarctic Gazetteer

External links
 Mugla Passage. Copernix satellite image

Bodies of water of Livingston Island
Bulgaria and the Antarctic
Straits of the South Shetland Islands